A large landslide occurred in Risaralda Department, Colombia on December 5, 2022.

Impact
At least 33 people were killed and nine others were rescued alive, four of them injured critically. All victims were inside a bus when the landslide buried the vehicle. At least three children were among those killed, according to Colombian President Gustavo Petro. The bus itself had around 25 passengers, and departed from Cali before the landslide.

See also 
 Weather of 2022

References

Landslides in Colombia
December 2022 events in South America
Landslides in 2022
2022 disasters in Colombia
2022 meteorology